Castle Street Row is a historic rowhouse block at 4-18 Castle Street in Worcester, Massachusetts.  Built c. 1873 by Worcester industrialist and developer Eli Thayer, the row of 8 units is the largest collection of rowhouse units remaining in the city from a somewhat larger number built around that time.  The three story brick buildings are Second Empire in style, with mansard roofs.  Although they were designed as single family homes, most of them had been subdivided by the late 1880s.

The rowhouse was listed on the National Register of Historic Places in 1980.

See also
National Register of Historic Places listings in southwestern Worcester, Massachusetts
National Register of Historic Places listings in Worcester County, Massachusetts

References

Buildings and structures in Worcester, Massachusetts
Residential buildings on the National Register of Historic Places in Massachusetts
Italianate architecture in Massachusetts
Houses completed in 1873
National Register of Historic Places in Worcester, Massachusetts